Namaklan-e Sofla (also Romanized as Namaklān-e Soflá and Namakgelān-e Soflá) is a village in Beyranvand-e Jonubi Rural District, Bayravand District, Khorramabad County, Lorestan Province, Iran. At the 2006 census, its population was 76, in 15 families.

References 

Towns and villages in Khorramabad County